AMP deaminase 2 is an enzyme that in humans is encoded by the AMPD2 gene. 

High AMPD2 expression levels correlate with poor patient outcome and a proliferative tumor phenotype in undifferentiated pleomorphic sarcoma (UPS).

References

External links

Further reading